The 2014 Fed Cup (also known as the 2014 Fed Cup by BNP Paribas for sponsorship purposes) was the 52nd edition of the most important tournament between national teams in women's tennis. The final took place on 8–9 November and was won by the Czech Republic. Petra Kvitová won both of her singles matches in that final against Germany, delivering two of the three points needed for victory of her team.

The draw took place on 10 July 2013 in Paris, France.

World Group 

Source:

Draw

World Group II 

The World Group II was the second highest level of Fed Cup competition in 2014. Winners advanced to the World Group play-offs, and losers played in the World Group II play-offs.

Dates: 8–9 February

Results:

World Group play-offs 

The four losing teams in the World Group first round ties, and four winners of the World Group II ties entered the draw for the World Group play-offs. Four seeded teams, based on the latest Fed Cup ranking, were drawn against four unseeded teams.

Dates: 19–20 April

Results:

 remained in the World Group in 2015.
 remained in World Group II in 2015.

World Group II play-offs 

The four losing teams from World Group II played off against qualifiers from Zonal Group I. Two teams qualified from Europe/Africa Zone, one team from the Asia/Oceania Zone, and one team from the Americas Zone.

Dates: 19–20 April

Results:

 and  remained in World Group II in 2015.
 and  remained in Zonal Group I in 2015.

Americas Zone 

 Nations in bold advanced to the higher level of competition.
 Nations in italics were relegated down to a lower level of competition.

Group I 
Venue: Yacht y Golf Club Paraguayo, Lambaré, Paraguay (outdoor clay)

Dates: Week commencing 3 February

Participating teams

Pool A

Pool B

Play-offs 

  advanced to World Group II play-offs.

Group II 
Venue: Palmas Athletic Club, Humacao, Puerto Rico (outdoor hard)

Dates: 7–12 April

Participating teams

Pool A

Pool B

Pool C

Pool D

Play-offs 

Asia/Oceania Zone 

 Nations in bold advanced to the higher level of competition.
 Nations in italics were relegated down to a lower level of competition.

Group I 
Venue: National Tennis Centre, Astana, Kazakhstan (indoor hard)

Dates: Week commencing 3 February

Participating teams

Pool A

Pool B

Play-offs 

  advanced to World Group II play-offs
  was relegated to Asia/Oceania Zone Group II in 2015

Group II 
Venue: National Tennis Centre, Astana, Kazakhstan (Indoor hard)

Dates: Week commencing 3 February

Participating teams

Pool A

Pool B

Pool C

Pool D

Play-offs 

  was promoted to Asia/Oceania Group I in 2015

Europe/Africa Zone 

 Nations in bold advanced to the higher level of competition.
 Nations in italics were relegated down to a lower level of competition.

Group I 
Venue: Syma Sport and Events Centre, Budapest, Hungary (indoor hard)

Dates: Week commencing 3 February

Participating teams

Pool A

Pool B

Pool C

Pool D 
 
 
 
 

 Remaining team

Play-offs 

  and  advanced to World Group II play-offs.

Group II 
Venue: Šiauliai Tennis School, Šiauliai, Lithuania (indoor hard)

Dates: 16–19 April 2014

Participating teams

Pool A 
 
 '''
   Pool B 
 
 
  

 Play-offs 

 Group III 
Venue: Tere Tennis Center, Tallinn, Estonia (indoor hard)

Dates: 5–8 February 2014

Participating teams

 Pool A 
 
  

 Pool B 
 
 
 

 Pool C 
 
 
 

 Pool D 
 
  

 Play-offs 

  and ''' were promoted to Europe/Africa Group II in 2015.

References

External links 
 fedcup.com

 
Fed Cup
Billie Jean King Cups by year
2014 in women's tennis